The Maritime Museum of Tasmania is a privately operated maritime museum dedicated to the history of Tasmania's association with the sea, ships, and ship-building, and is located at Carnegie House in Sullivans Cove, Hobart, Tasmania.

History
The island state of Tasmania has a long and rich history of association with the sea, going back well before the time of British invasion and settlement on the island. The indigenous Tasmanians were known to have strong affiliations with the sea, and surrounding islands.
The British of course arrived by sea, and since the time of their first arrival in 1803, Tasmania has had a continuous history or sailing, maritime trade, fishing and other maritime activities. The museum sets out to chart, document and display materials and artefacts related to that history.
Maritime enthusiasts first began to argue that the Tasmanian Museum and Art Gallery should include a room dedicated to Tasmania's maritime history in the 1930s. However it wasn't until 1972, when six volunteers decided to create a dedicated museum, that the Maritime Museum of Tasmania was born. It was originally housed in St. George's Church, Battery Point, and opened in 1973, with an official opening in 1974.

Development
In 1983 the museum relocated into Secheron House (built 1831), a much more appropriate location, and this also allowed the museum to expand.
The Government of Tasmania decided to sell Secheron House in 1999, and the Museum took the opportunity to relocate and develop into a major educational institution and public attraction. The museum relocated to its current home, the Carnegie Building, which placed it alongside the docks of Sullivans Cove, in close proximity to both the CBD and the Tasmanian Museum and Art Gallery. The new expanded and modern renovated Carnegie building was opened as the Maritime Museum of Tasmania by Queen Elizabeth II on 28 March 2000.

See also
Australian National Maritime Museum
Shipwrecks of Tasmania
List of museums in Tasmania

References

External links
MMT website
Maritime Museum of Tasmania online collection

Maritime museums in Australia
Museums in Hobart
Museums established in 1973
1973 establishments in Australia